Çakılköy may refer to:

 Çakılköy, Bandırma, a village in Balıkesir Province, Turkey
 Çakılköy, Çan, a village in Çanakkale Province, Turkey